Bruno (or Brun) von Bayern (c. 992–1029) was the son of Henry II, Duke of Bavaria (the Wrangler or Quarrelsome) and Gisela of Burgundy. He was the younger brother of St. Henry II of Germany, the only Holy Roman Emperor to be made a saint. He and his brother were tutored by Wolfgang of Regensburg.

Bruno later became a canon of Hildesheim. In 1003 Bruno supported the revolt of Henry of Schweinfurt, Margrave of the Nordgau against the Emperor. When the revolt failed, Bruno fled to Bohemia and then stayed for a time at the court of his brother-in-law, Stephen I of Hungary. He was reconciled to his brother in early 1004, through the efforts of Stephen of Hungary.

Bruno served as chancellor for a year before being elected Bishop of Augsburg in 1006 or 1007, a post he held until 1029. As a bishop, he encouraged King Stephen of Hungary's efforts to convert rebellious pagans to the new faith.

The diocese of Augsburg attained great splendor under Bishop Bruno (1006–20); he restored a number of ruined monasteries, founded the church and college of St. Maurice, placed Benedictine monks in the collegiate church of St. Afra, and added to the episcopal possessions by the gift of his own inheritance of Straubing.

Bruno was exiled in 1024, possibly over a disagreement with Henry over the founding of the Diocese of Bamberg. Bruno later became an important adviser to Emperor Conrad II. In 1026, Bruno was named regent in Germany during Conrad's expedition in Italy. That same year Henry V, Duke of Bavaria, brother of Henry II's wife Cunigunde of Luxembourg, died without issue. Bruno was the closest related heir, but as an ecclesiastic could not claim the title. Before leaving for Italy, Conrad named his son Henry as his heir, and recognizing the Bishop as an experienced statesman, named Bruno Henry's guardian and tutor. During Conrad's absence, Welf II, Count of Swabia sacked and pillaged the city of Augsburg, seizing the Bishop's treasury. Bruno escaped across the Alps, taking the young Henry with him, and joined Conrad in Italy.   Upon Conrad's return, Welf was imprisoned and compelled to make restitution. Conrad named his son Henry, Duke of Bavaria. Herwig Wolfram suggests that Bruno's appointment as young Henry's guardian was in anticipation of this.

Bishop Bruno died in Ratisbon in 1029 and was buried in the church of St. Maurice in Augsburg.

References

1029 deaths
Ottonian dynasty
11th-century Roman Catholic bishops in Bavaria
Year of birth unknown
History of Augsburg
Year of birth uncertain
Sons of monarchs